Jimmy Murrison (born 8 November 1964) is a Scottish lead guitar player, a member of the band Nazareth.

Born in Aberdeen, Scotland, Murrison played with the band 'Trouble in Doggieland' (a fellow member being Pete Agnew's son Lee) before accepting an invitation to join Nazareth in 1994, replacing Billy Rankin. He became the band's permanent lead guitarist.

The albums Murrison has released with Nazareth include Boogaloo (1998), The Very Best of Nazareth (2001), Homecoming (2002), Alive & Kicking (2003), Maximum XS: The Essential Nazareth (2004), Golden Hits Nazareth (2004), Live in Brazil (2007), The Newz (2008), Big Dogz (2011), Rock 'n' Roll Telephone (2014) and Tattooed on My Brain (2018).

Murrison has now been with Nazareth since 1994, making him the group's longest serving guitarist, founding member Manny Charlton (1968-1990) having clocked up 22 years.

References

1964 births
Living people
People from Aberdeen
Scottish rock guitarists
Scottish heavy metal guitarists
Lead guitarists
Scottish male guitarists
Nazareth (band) members